The Chytriomycetaceae are a family of fungi in the order Chytridiales.

Genera

Chytriomyces
Rhizoclosmatium
Rhizidium
Podochytrium
Obelidium
Siphonaria
Entophlyctis
Physocladia
Asterophlyctis
Fayochytriomyces
Avachytrium
Odontochytrium
Rodmanochytrium

References 

Fungus families
Chytridiomycota